Samuel Fuchs (born 4 March 1984) is a Brazilian volleyball player who won a silver medal at the 2008 Summer Olympics.

He was born in Curitiba.

References

1984 births
Living people
Brazilian men's volleyball players
Volleyball players at the 2008 Summer Olympics
Olympic volleyball players of Brazil
Olympic silver medalists for Brazil
Brazilian people of German descent
Volleyball players at the 2007 Pan American Games
Olympic medalists in volleyball
Sportspeople from Curitiba
Medalists at the 2008 Summer Olympics
Pan American Games gold medalists for Brazil
Pan American Games medalists in volleyball
Medalists at the 2007 Pan American Games
21st-century Brazilian people